Bad Dürrenberg is a spa town in the Saalekreis district, in Saxony-Anhalt, Germany. It is situated on the river Saale, approx. 8 km southeast of Merseburg. It is known for its graduation tower, the largest one in Germany.

Geography 
The town of Bad Dürrenberg is located on the river Saale between the cities of Leipzig, Merseburg and Weißenfels. In the south of the town, the Ellerbach flows into the right side of the Saale.

Neighboring districts 
The neighboring districts are Leuna to the north, Markranstädt in (Leipzig district) to the east, Lützen (Burgenlandkreis) to the south and, to the west, Weißenfels (Burgenlandkreis).

Town and hinterland
The following table shows the population of the town itself and those of the municipal divisions (Ortschaften) which were formerly independent municipalities. Oebles-Schlechtewitz was absorbed into Bad Dürrenberg in 2008, and Nempitz and Tollwitz in 2010.

Events and festivals
Each year on the last weekend of June the town has a festival held over a period of three days, which is known as Brunnenfest (Well Celebration).

Population development 
Historical population (from 1995 as of 31 December). Values since 2010 also include neighboring villages which were annexed by the town.

1 3 October

Mayors

 Kurt Eckart (SPD), May–June 1945
 Karl Herfurth (KPD), July 1945 – 1946
 Paul Drese (SED), 1946-1947
 Fritz Singer, 1948-1952
 Kurt Boose, from 1951 (deputy)
 Gerry Chisel (SED), from 1952 acting / Edmund Jatz
 Martha Wessler (SED), 1953-1976
 Liselotte Wehowski (SED), 1976-1986
 Frank Klappach (SED), 1986-1988
 Karin Zeisler (SED), 1988-1990
 Thomas Heilmann (CDU), 1990-2001
 Jürgen Elste (FDP), 2001-2008
 Árpád Nemes (CDU), 2008-2015
 Christoph Schulze (CDU), since 2015

Personality

Sons and daughters of the town

 Ibrahim Böhme (1944–1999), politician
 Lars-Broder Keil (born 1963), journalist and author
 Andreas Ihle (born 1979), world champion and Olympic champion in canoe racing

Those associated with the town

 Novalis (1772–1801), early Romantics, philosopher and lawyer
 Johann Trommsdorff (1770–1837), pharmacist and chemist
 Karl von Fritsch (1838–1906), a paleontologist and geologist, president of the Leopoldina
 Ernst Fraenkel (political scientist) (1898–1975), political scientist and lawyer
 Karin Haftenberger, (born 1948), canoeist, competed in the 1968 Summer Olympics

Twin towns – sister cities
 Melle, Germany
 Caudebec-lès-Elbeuf, France
 Ciechocinek, Poland
 Encs, Hungary

Gallery

References

Saalekreis